Abanoz is a Turkish name. It may mean the following:

People 
 Salim Abanoz, Turkish judoka

Places 
Abanoz, Mersin, a summer resort in district of Anamur, Mersin Province, Turkey